Frederick Douglass was an African-American social reformer, abolitionist, orator, writer, and statesman.

Frederick Douglass may also refer to:
 Frederick Douglass Jr., son of Frederick Douglas, abolitionist, essayist and newspaper editor
 Frederick Douglass (Moore opera), a 1985 opera by Dorothy Rudd Moore
 Frederick Douglass (Ulysses Kay opera) (1991)
 Frederick Douglass (Weitzman), a 2013 bronze sculpture by Steven Weitzman in Washington, D.C.
 Frederick Douglass (Edwards), a 2015 bronze sculpture by Andrew Edwards in College Park, Maryland
 Frederick Douglass: The Lion Who Wrote History, a 2017 picture book biography by Walter Dean Myers
 Frederick Douglass: Prophet of Freedom, a 2018 biography by David W. Blight

See also
 Frederick Douglas (disambiguation)
 List of things named after Frederick Douglass